The 2019 South Gloucestershire Council election took place on 2 May 2019 to elect members of South Gloucestershire Council in England as part of nationwide  local elections.

A 2018 boundary change meant that the total number of seats in the council was reduced from 70 to 61. The Conservatives retained their control of the council, sliding from 40 seats to 33. The Liberal Democrats increased from 16 to 17 seats, and Labour lost three, going to 11.

Summary

Election result

|-

Ward results

In wards that are represented by more than one councillor, electors were given more than one vote each, hence the voter turnout may not match the number of votes cast.

†Increased to 2 seats

†Formerly 'Chipping Sodbury'

†Reduced from 3 seats

†Reduced from 3 seats

References

District - District and Parish Elections 2019 - Thursday, 2nd May, 2019

2019 English local elections
May 2019 events in the United Kingdom
2019
2010s in the South Gloucestershire District